The Yamaha XMAX is a series of maxi-scooters manufactured by Yamaha Motor Company since 2006.

It is available in four engines (the 125, 250, 300 and the 400 cm3), and is enjoying strong commercial success in Europe. It belongs to the GT category because of its lines, its sportiness and its comfort. In 2010, Yamaha marketed a model revised and corrected to pass European emission standard Euro 3. In 2017, Yamaha marketed the 300 model meeting Euro 4 standards, the 125 model in 2021 met the Euro 5 standards.

References

XMAX
Maxi scooters
Motorcycles introduced in 2006